The Wales women's national under-17 football team represents Wales in international women's youth football competitions.

FIFA U-17 Women's World Cup

The team has never qualified for the FIFA U-17 Women's World Cup

UEFA Women's Under-17 Championship

The team has never qualified

See also
Wales women's national football team

External links
UEFA.com

References 

F
Youth football in Wales
Women's national under-17 association football teams